Sir William Molesworth, 8th Baronet,  (23 May 181022 October 1855) was a Radical British politician, who served in the coalition cabinet of The Earl of Aberdeen from 1853 until his death in 1855 as First Commissioner of Works and then Secretary of State for the Colonies.

Much later, when justifying to the Queen his own new appointments, Gladstone told her: "For instance, even in Ld Aberdeen's Govt, in 52, Sir William Molesworth had been selected, at that time, a very advanced Radical, but who was perfectly harmless, & took little, or no part... He said these people generally became very moderate, when they were in office", which she admitted had been the case.

Background
Molesworth was born in London and succeeded to the baronetcy in 1823. He was educated privately before entering St John's College, Cambridge as a fellow commoner. Moving to Trinity College, he fought a duel with his tutor, and was sent down from the university. He also studied abroad and at Edinburgh University for some time. Molesworth was a member of the London Electrical Society.

Political career
On the passing of the Reform Act 1832 Molesworth was returned to Parliament for the Eastern division of Cornwall, to support the ministry of Lord Grey. Through Charles Buller he made the acquaintance of George Grote and James Mill, and in April 1835 he founded, in conjunction with Roebuck, the London Review, as an organ of the Philosophic Radicals. After the publication of two volumes he purchased the Westminster Review, and for some time the united magazines were edited by him and John Stuart Mill. Buller and Molesworth were associated with Edward Gibbon Wakefield and his schemes for colonising South Australia, Canada and New Zealand.

From 1837 to 1841 Molesworth sat for Leeds, and acquired considerable influence in the House of Commons by his speeches and by his tact in presiding over the select committee on penal transportation. But his Radicalism made little impression either on the house or on his constituency. In 1839 he commenced and carried to completion, at a cost of £6000, a reprint of the entire miscellaneous and voluminous writings of Thomas Hobbes, which were placed in most of the English university and provincial libraries. The publication did him great disservice in public life, his opponents endeavouring to identify him with the freethinking opinions of Hobbes in religion as well as with the philosopher's conclusions in favor of despotic government. From 1841 to 1845 he had no seat in parliament, but in 1842 served as High Sheriff of Cornwall.

In 1845 Molesworth was returned for Southwark, and retained that seat until his death. On his return to parliament he devoted special attention to the condition of the colonies, and was the ardent champion of their self-government. In January 1853, Lord Aberdeen included him as the only Radical in his coalition cabinet as First Commissioner of Works, the chief work by which his name was brought into prominence at this time being the construction of the new Westminster Bridge; he also was the first to open Kew Gardens on Sundays. In July 1855, he was made Colonial Secretary, an office he held until his death in October of the same year.

Personal life
It is known that Molesworth collected, paraphrased and published many of the works of Thomas Hobbes between 1839 and 1845 in the eleven volumes of The English Works of Thomas Hobbes of Malmesbury; Now First Collected and Edited by Sir William Molesworth, Bart. Those works included Hobbes's translation of the Iliad.

Molesworth became engaged in June and married Andalusia Grant Carstairs on 9 July 1844. She had been a singer and was not from a noble family. Moleworth's family were opposed to the match.

He died on 22 October 1855, aged 45. He had no children, and the baronetcy passed to a cousin. He is buried at Kensal Green Cemetery, London, on the north side of the main path leading from the entrance to the central chapel.

The philanthropist John Passmore Edwards installed a likeness of Sir William Molesworth as a memorial medallion in the Borough Road public library in Southwark as a mark of appreciation such that, "In so doing, we gratefully remember illustrious and useful lives into whose labours we have entered, and keep before us examples worthy of admiration."

Biography
Millicent Garrett Fawcett, Life of the Right Hon. Sir William Molesworth, London: Macmillan,  1901
Alison Adburgham, A Radical Aristocrat: the Rt. Hon. Sir William Molesworth, Bart., PC, MP of Pencarrow and his wife Andalusia. (Padstow: Tabb House, 1980)

References

External links 

1810 births
1855 deaths
Alumni of St John's College, Cambridge
Alumni of the University of Edinburgh
Members of the Parliament of the United Kingdom for English constituencies
Members of the Parliament of the United Kingdom for constituencies in Cornwall
Baronets in the Baronetage of England
British Secretaries of State
Members of the Privy Council of the United Kingdom
UK MPs 1832–1835
UK MPs 1835–1837
UK MPs 1837–1841
UK MPs 1841–1847
UK MPs 1847–1852
UK MPs 1852–1857
Politicians from Cornwall
Burials at Kensal Green Cemetery
Fellows of the Royal Society
High Sheriffs of Cornwall
Secretaries of State for the Colonies
Committee members of the Society for the Diffusion of Useful Knowledge